Hyperolius steindachneri is a species of frog in the family Hyperoliidae.
It is found in Angola, the Democratic Republic of the Congo, and Zambia.
Its natural habitats are swamps, freshwater marshes, and intermittent freshwater marshes.

References

steindachneri
Amphibians described in 1866
Taxonomy articles created by Polbot